Blues a la Mode is an album by saxophonist Budd Johnson which was recorded in 1958 and released on the Felsted label.

Reception

Scott Yanow of AllMusic states, "The leader contributed all six numbers and stars in prime form throughout; Shavers and Bryant also fare quite well".

Track listing
All compositions by Budd Johnson except where noted.
 "Foggy Nights" – 5:37
 "Leave Room in Your Heart for Me" (Budd Johnson, John Dobson) – 7:16
 "Destination Blues" – 5:19
 "A la Mode" – 7:31
 "Used Blues" – 7:05
 "Blues by Five" – 6:06

Personnel
Budd Johnson – tenor saxophone
Charlie Shavers – trumpet
Vic Dickenson – trombone (tracks 1, 3 & 5)
Al Sears – baritone saxophone (tracks 1, 3 & 5)
Bert Keyes – piano, organ (tracks 1, 3, 5)
Ray Bryant – piano (tracks 2, 4, 6)
Joe Benjamin – bass
Jo Jones – drums

References

Budd Johnson albums
1958 albums
Felsted Records albums